Radical Democratic Party is the name of several political parties:

Estonian Radical Democratic Party
Radical Democratic Party (Bulgaria)
Radical Democratic Party (India)
Radical Democratic Party (Spain)
Radical Democratic Party of Switzerland
Radical Democratic Party (Germany)

See also
Radical Democracy Party (United States)